Konrad Sebastian Winkler (20 January 1882 – 16 January 1962) was a Polish fencer. He competed in the individual foil and team sabre at the 1924 Summer Olympics.

References

External links
 

1882 births
1962 deaths
Polish male fencers
Olympic fencers of Poland
Fencers at the 1924 Summer Olympics
Fencers from Warsaw